Rosalía is a Mexican telenovela produced by Guillermo Diazayas for Televisa in 1978.

Cast 
Rosalía Valdés as Rosalía
Juan Pelaez as René
Salvador Pineda as Leonel
Lilia Michell as Leticia
Rafael Baledón as Roberto
Lilia Aragón as Hortencia
Victoria Vera as Marcia
Regina Torné as Aurora
Erika Carrasco as Silvia
Alma Delfina

References

External links 

Mexican telenovelas
1978 telenovelas
Televisa telenovelas
Spanish-language telenovelas
1978 Mexican television series debuts
1978 Mexican television series endings